Frida Vogels (born 9 January 1930, in Soest) is a Dutch writer, known especially for her partly autobiographical trilogy De harde kern ("The hard core"), the second part of which was awarded the inaugural Libris Prize in 1994.  Vogels is noted for the close connection between her work and her life, as well as for her low profile: she did not appear at the presentation of the Libris Prize, and there are no photographs published of her.  Vogels lives in Bologna, Italy.

Career
Vogels' literary career began with De harde kern, on which she had been at work for four decades; the first volume was published in 1992. The Libris Prize for the second volume, published 1993, garnered her commercial and critical success; the third volume, a collection of poems, was published in 1994. Since then she has published eight of the sixteen planned volumes of her diaries, and in 2011 a booklet containing diary entries of Aunt Lucietta, an aunt of her husband.

As an editor, Vogels selected texts by Dutch author Bert Weijde (1932-1986) for a posthumously published collection Onder het ijs ("Under the ice"). She has also inspired other authors: she and Weijde were friends of J. J. Voskuil, and she appears in his Bij nader inzien as Henriëtte Fagel; conversely, Voskuil appears in De harde kern as Jacob.

Vogels also translates from Italian to Dutch, and has rendered works by Giacomo Debenedetti, Primo Levi, Cesare Pavese, and Salvatore Satta.

References

External links
Frida Vogels at Van Oorschot

1930 births
Living people
20th-century Dutch novelists
Dutch women novelists
Libris Prize winners
People from Soest, Netherlands
20th-century women writers
20th-century Dutch women